Kono may refer to:

Geography
Kono District, a district in the Eastern Province of Sierra Leone
Kono people, an ethnic group in Sierra Leone
Kono, Nigeria, a village in Rivers State, Nigeria
Kōno, Fukui, a village in Fukui, Japan
Kono people Nigeria, an ethnic group in Kauru Local Government Area of Kaduna state Nigeria

Languages
Kono language (Sierra Leone), a Mande language of Sierra Leone
Kono language (Guinea), a Mande language of Guinea
Kono language (Nigeria), a Benue-Congo language of Nigeria

People with the surname
Kōno, a Japanese family name (including a list of people with the name)
 Hiromichi Kono (1905-1963), Japanese entomologist and anthropologist
, Japanese voice actress

Other
Gonu, Korean traditional board games
Jonas Saeed, a Swedish musician who goes by the stage name KONO

See also
KONO (disambiguation)
Konno, a surname
Kouno (disambiguation)
Kono Kalakaua (disambiguation)

Japanese-language surnames